Kissenia is a genus of flowering plants belonging to the family Loasaceae.

Its native range is from northeastern tropical Africa to the southwestern Arabian Peninsula, and Namibia to South Africa.

Species:

Kissenia arabica 
Kissenia capensis

References

Loasaceae
Cornales genera